Mestia (Mesṫiis municiṗaliṫeṫi) is a district of Georgia, in the region of Samegrelo-Zemo Svaneti. Its main town is Mestia.

It has an area of 3,045 km2 and had a population of 9,316 at the 2014 census.

Politics
Mestia Municipal Assembly (Georgian: მესტიის საკრებულო, Mestia Sakrebulo) is a representative body in Mestia Municipality, consisting of 31 members which is elected every four years. The last election was held in October 2021. Kapiton Zhorzholiani of Georgian Dream was re-elected mayor.

Settlements

See also 
 List of municipalities in Georgia (country)

References

External links 
 Districts of Georgia, Statoids.com

Municipalities of Samegrelo-Zemo Svaneti